Jeffrey Scott Moore (born 1962) is the Murchison-Mallory Professor of Chemistry and a Professor of Materials Science & Engineering at the University of Illinois at Urbana–Champaign.  He has received awards for both teaching and research, and as of 2014, was named a Howard Hughes Medical Institute Professor. In 2017, he was named Director of the Beckman Institute for Advanced Science and Technology at the University of Illinois, after serving as Interim Director for one year.

Early life and education
Jeffrey Scott Moore was born in 1962 near Joliet, Illinois.  He was awarded his B.S. in chemistry in 1984 and his Ph.D. in Materials Science and Engineering in 1989, both from the University of Illinois at Urbana–Champaign. At Illinois, he worked with Samuel I. Stupp on the molecular organization of polymers, and developed a new room temperature technique for the polyesterification of high molecular weight polyesters.

Career
After briefly working as an NSF postdoctoral fellow at the California Institute of Technology with Robert H. Grubbs, Moore joined the chemistry faculty at the University of Michigan in Ann Arbor, Michigan in 1990.

In 1993 Moore returned to the University of Illinois as one of the chemistry faculty. He is currently a professor of materials science and engineering, and holds the title of Murchison-Mallory Chair in the Department of Chemistry. He is a member of the Materials Research Laboratory, and in 1994, he became a part-time faculty member at the Beckman Institute for Advanced Science and Technology, both at the University of Illinois. He is a member of the Autonomous Materials Systems Group, and has served as co-chair of the Institute's Molecular and Electronic Nanostructures theme.

As a teacher, Moore has developed innovative approaches to large enrollment courses in organic chemistry at the university, integrating online resources, webcasts, and Web-based conferencing to encourage curiosity-driven learning, student participation, autonomy, and problem solving. Moore has served as Faculty Advisor to the University of Illinois' Society of Postdoctoral Scholars since January 2011. He is credited with "changing the national conversation about how students should learn and about what constitutes an optimum educational environment."

Moore served as interim head of the Department of Chemistry at the University of Illinois from 2012-2013. He was named a Howard Hughes Medical Institute Professor in 2014.  He became the Director of the Beckman Institute for Advanced Science and Technology in May 2017, after having served as Interim Director since April 2016. Moore replaced Arthur F. Kramer, who became the new senior vice provost for research
at Northeastern University.

Research
Drawing upon physical organic chemistry and materials science, Moore's group of researchers at the University of Illinois studies the synthesis of large organic molecules and seeks to discover new polymers. Some of Moore's early work utilized the phenylacetylene moiety in the construction of nanoscale structures such as macrocycles and dendrimers. 
He has extensively studied macromolecular architectures, 
the molecular construction of structures such as foldamers, 
and the synthesis of shape-persistent macrocycles.

Understanding the ways in which polymers undergo chemical reactions and produce chemical signals has made it possible to design
polymers that can respond to mechanical activation.  One of Moore's goals is to engineer mechanically responsive materials that will be safer and last longer than current materials. 
Working with colleagues such as Nancy Sottos and Scott R. White, he has developed self-healing polymeric materials. Moore has shown that microencapsulated healing agents can polymerize to heal areas of damage such as cracks smaller than a human hair.

Responsive materials can also be designed to change in response to indicators such as high stress, to signal that problems such as cracks are in danger of developing. Moore's team has developed sensors that can detect and respond to mechanical force. For example, a molecular probe can undergo a color change to signal possible damage.  In 2005, Moore, Jennifer A. Lewis and others demonstrated a light-sensitive monolayer that could be used to design colloidal fluids, gels and crystals whose surface charge and chemical structure would change depending on their exposure to ultraviolet light. More recently Moore and others have created heat-sensitive microspheres that react to conditions such as thermal runaway in lithium-ion batteries.

Moore, Sottos and White have demonstrated a novel mechanochemical approach to the manipulation of matter by using mechanical force to bias reaction pathways and prioritize certain chemical transformations over others in chemical reactions. This approach enables scientists to create products that would be impossible to obtain under conventional conditions.

As of 2014, Moore's team demonstrated a two-stage process that would enable larger areas of damage, on the order of a bullet hole, to be regenerated. The responsive material initially creates a scaffold which is then filled in through secondary chemical reactions.

Moore has been a principal investigator (PI) or co-PI for a number of federal and corporate grants, often working with colleagues across disciplines. In 2007, as PI of "Mechanochemically-Active Polymer Composites", he was one of the winners of a Multi-University Research Initiative (MURI) grant competition from the Department of Defense.

As of 2012, Moore became the lead investigator for a multi-institutional project working with the Department of Energy (DOE) Joint Center for Energy Storage Research (JCESR) on batteries and energy storage. The Argonne National Laboratory will collaborate with universities and private firms to develop next-generation battery and energy storage technologies, suitable for use in electric and hybrid cars and for storage in the electricity grid. Moore's group is studying redox-active molecules and macromolecules so as to develop macromolecular designs for  non-aqueous redox flow battery systems.

Jeffrey S. Moore has published over 300 articles in journals such as Macromolecules, the Journal of Chemical Education, Advanced Materials and the Journal of Materials Chemistry. He served as an Associate Editor for the Journal of the American Chemical Society from July 1999 to 2013.

Awards and honors
He has been elected as a Fellow of the National Academy of Sciences, Royal Society of Chemistry, the American Association for the Advancement of Science, and the American Academy of Arts and Sciences (2008).   He is a Fellow of the American Chemical Society (ACS, 2010) and of the division of Polymeric Materials: Science and Engineering (PMSE) of the ACS (2010).

His awards include an Alfred P. Sloan Fellowship (1997), an Arthur C. Cope Scholar Award (1996), and an NSF Young Investigator Award (1992).

In 2014, Moore was named a Howard Hughes Medical Institute Professor. In 2015 he received a Leete Award from the American Chemical Society Division of Organic Chemistry for "outstanding contributions to teaching and research in organic chemistry".

Moore has received the Campus Award for Excellence in Undergraduate Teaching, the Liberal Arts & Sciences Dean's Award for Excellence in Undergraduate Teaching, and a Dreyfus Teacher-Scholar Award (1994).  He is one of Illinois' "Faculty Ranked Excellent by their Students".

Selected bibliography

Self-healing materials

Mechanochemistry

Macromolecular architectures

Energy storage materials

References

External links
Moore Group Website

1962 births
Living people
21st-century American chemists
Grainger College of Engineering alumni
University of Illinois Urbana-Champaign faculty
University of Michigan faculty
Sloan Research Fellows
Members of the United States National Academy of Sciences
Fellows of the American Association for the Advancement of Science
Fellows of the American Chemical Society
Fellows of the American Academy of Arts and Sciences